Nationality words link to articles with information on the nation's poetry or literature (for instance, Irish or France).

Events
 Christopher Smart wins the Seatonian Prize for the third time. He won it in 1750 and 1751 and will win it again in 1755.

Works published
 John Armstrong, Taste: An epistle to a young critic
 Theophilus Cibber, The Lives of the Poets of Great Britain and Ireland, compiled mostly by Robert Shiels with added material and revisions by Cibber (prose biography)
 Thomas Cooke, An Ode on Benevolence, published anonymously
 Robert Dodsley, Public Virtue
 Thomas Francklin, Translation: A poem
 Richard Gifford, Contemplation: A poem, published anonymously
 Thomas Gray, "Hymn to Adversity"
 Henry Jones, Merit: A poem
 William Kenrick, The Whole Duty of Woman, published anonymously
 Heyat Mahmud, Hitaggyānbāṇī; Bengali
 John Ogilvie, The Day of Judgment, published anonymously
 Christopher Pitt, and others, The Works of Virgil, in Latin and English, for Pitt, publication was posthumous
 Christopher Smart, The Hilliad: an epic poem, a satire on Sir John Hill (1716?–1775), editor of the British Magazine, sparked by some of Hill's criticisms in the August 1752 issue of The Impertinent (the only issue published) of Smart's Poems on Several Occasions that year
 William Smith, A Poem on Visiting the Academy of Philadelphia, June 1753, Smith had been invited to visit by Benjamin Franklin; the academy would later become the University of Pennsylvania; Smith would later be hired as an instructor and became the first provost after he helped change the academy into the College of Philadelphia'
 John Wesley and Charles Wesley, Hymns and Spiritual Songs
 George Whitefield, Hymns for Social Worship, an anthology

Births
Death years link to the corresponding "[year] in poetry" article:
 March 8 – William Roscoe (died 1831), English historian, abolitionist, poet and writer
 April 11 – Lady Sophia Burrell, née Raymond (died 1802), English poet and dramatist
 July 8 – Ann Yearsley, née Cromartie (died 1806), English poet and writer
 December 19 – George Ellis (died 1815), Jamaican-born English politician, satirical poet and literary historian
 John Frederick Bryant (died 1791), English pipe-maker and poet
 Dhiro (died 1825), Indian, Gujarati-language devotional poet
 Irayimman Tampi (died 1856), Indian, Malayalam-language poet in the court of Swati Tirunal Rama Varma; writer of Omana tinkal kitjavo, a "cradle song" (or lullaby) still popular in Malayalam
 Approximate date – Phillis Wheatley (died 1784), Senegalese-born African-American poet; becomes a slave at age 7

Deaths
Death years link to the corresponding "[year] in poetry" article:
 September 18 – Hristofor Zhefarovich (born unknown), Serbian painter, engraver, writer and poet
November – Giuseppe Valentini (born 1681), Italian poet, composer and painter

See also

 Poetry
 List of years in poetry
 18th century in poetry
 Paper War of 1752–1753
 Augustan poetry
 Augustan literature

Notes

18th-century poetry
Poetry